The sixth season of Criminal Minds premiered on CBS on September 22, 2010 and ended May 18, 2011. 

Before the filming of the season began, it was announced that A. J. Cook had been let go from the series, reportedly due to budget cuts on the show relating to the launch of the Criminal Minds spinoff. Thanks to letters and petitions by fans, Cook was allowed to return for two episodes to wrap up her character's storyline. She later returned as a special guest star in two subsequent episodes of this season. Paget Brewster was a regular for eighteen episodes and was let go from the series as well. Rachel Nichols appeared as a guest star for two episodes and was then promoted as a regular, but her contract wasn't picked up after the season finale. 

The opening sequence was changed this season: more sound and visual effects were added; the theme song itself was amplified, and an electric guitar part was added.

Cast

Main 
 Joe Mantegna as Supervisory Special Agent David Rossi (BAU Senior Agent)
 Paget Brewster as Supervisory Special Agent Emily Prentiss (BAU Agent) (Ep. 1-18)
 Shemar Moore as Supervisory Special Agent Derek Morgan (BAU Agent)
 Matthew Gray Gubler as Supervisory Special Agent Dr. Spencer Reid (BAU Agent)
A. J. Cook as Supervisory Special Agent Jennifer "JJ" Jareau (BAU Communications Liaison) (Ep. 1-2)
Kirsten Vangsness as Special Agent Penelope Garcia (BAU Technical Analyst & Co-Communications Liaison)
Rachel Nichols as Special Agent Ashley Seaver (BAU Agent) (Ep. 10-24)
Thomas Gibson as Supervisory Special Agent Aaron "Hotch" Hotchner (BAU Unit Chief & Co-Communications Liaison)

Recurring 
 Jayne Atkinson as Supervisory Special Agent Erin Strauss (BAU Section Chief)
 Cade Owens as Jack Hotchner
 Isabella Murad as Ellie Spicer
 Timothy V. Murphy as Ian Doyle
 Sebastian Roché as Clyde Easter
 Siena Goines as Tsia Mosely
 Nicholas Brendon as Kevin Lynch
 A. J. Cook as Special Agent Jennifer "JJ" Jareau (Ep. 18 & 24)

Guest stars 

In the season premiere "The Longest Night", Tim Curry reprised his role as one of the series' most notorious criminals, Billy Flynn, also known as "The Prince of Darkness". Robert Davi reprised his role as Detective Adam Kurzbard, who led the investigation of the murders. In the episode "J.J.", Chris Marquette guest-starred as James Barrett, a man who abducted and attempted to murder Kate Joyce. In the episode "Remembrance of Things Past", Daniel J. Travanti guest-starred as Lee Mullens, a serial killer who suffers from Alzheimer's disease. In the episode "Compromising Positions", Craig Sheffer guest-starred as James Thomas, an impotent serial killer who murders married couples.

In the episode "Safe Haven", Sterling Beaumon guest-starred as Jeremy Sayers, a juvenile delinquent and family annihilator who has been hated by his mother ever since he was born. Mare Winningham guest-starred as Nancy Riverton, a mother who allows Jeremy to stay in their home for the night. In the episode "Devil's Night", Leonard Roberts guest-starred as Kaman Scott, a disfigured serial killer who burns his victims alive during Devil's Night, the notorious pre-Halloween celebration. In the episode "Middle Man", Steve Talley, Michael Grant Terry, and Jake Thomas guest-starred as Michael Kosina, Christopher Salters, and Scott Kagan, aka "The Johnson County Brotherhood", a trio of serial rapists and killers who abduct exotic dancers. Melissa Claire Egan guest starred as Tara Dice, an exotic dancer who is questioned by Prentiss and Reid.

In the episode "Reflection of Desire", Robert Knepper guest-starred as Rhett Walden, also known as "The Hill Ripper", a schizophrenic abductor who idolizes the movie Reflection of Desire, a film his deceased mother starred in. Sally Kirkland guest-starred as May Walden, a famous actress from Hollywood's Golden Age who, because of her pregnancy, made only one motion picture, and her career was ruined afterwards. Whitney Able guest-starred as Penny Hanley, a woman Walden abducts after Kelly Landis' murder. In the episode "Into the Woods", Gattlin Griffith guest-starred as Robert Brooks, a young boy who is abducted and raped by Shane Wyland. Emily Alyn Lind guest-starred as Anna Brooks, Robert's younger sister who is also abducted by Wyland.

In the episode "What Happens at Home", Kenneth Mitchell guest-starred as Drew Jacobs, a serial killer who murders several women, including his own wife. Madison Leisle guest starred as Jacobs' daughter, Heather. In the episode "25 to Life", Kyle Secor guest-starred as Donald Sanderson, a man who was framed and imprisoned for the murder of his family, and Philip Casnoff guest-starred as James Stanworth, the man responsible for framing Sanderson and murdering his family. Angus Macfadyen guest-starred as Sean McCallister, Emily Prentiss' former boss at Interpol who is murdered by one of the series most notorious criminals, Ian Doyle, played by Timothy V. Murphy. In the episode "The Thirteenth Step", Jonathan Tucker and Adrianne Palicki guest-starred as Raymond Donovan and Sydney Manning, two young lovers who go on a killing spree.

In the episode "Today I Do", Rebecca Field guest-starred as Jane Gould, a stalker and abductor who acts as a caretaker so she can be appreciated. Rachel Miner guest-starred as Molly Grandin, a woman who Gould abducts and holds captive in her house. In the episode "Coda", Lew Temple guest-starred as Bill Thomas, a man who abducts the parents of Sammy Sparks, a boy who has autism. Mimi Kennedy guest-starred as Sammy's social worker Mrs. Rogers. In the episode "Lauren", Patrick Fischler guest-starred as Jack Fahey, an Irish mobster and an associate of Ian Doyle. In the episode "With Friends Like These", Bug Hall guest-starred as Ben Foster, a schizophrenic spree killer who, after burning down a church, begins hallucinating three people who died there.

In the episode "Hanley Waters", Kelli Williams guest-starred as Shelly Chamberlain, a spree killer who is unable to come to terms with the death of her son, who died in a car crash. In the episode "Out of the Light", Jeffrey Meek guest-starred as Robert Bremmer, a serial killer who raped his stepdaughter, Rose, and began abducting, raping, and murdering women who resemble Rose. In the season finale "Supply and Demand", Angela Sarafyan guest-starred as Lucy, the leader of a human trafficking ring who poses as one of the victims. Amy Price-Francis guest-starred as Supervisory Special Agent Andi Swann, the Unit Chief of the Domestic Trafficking Task Force and Sarah Foret guest-starred as Renee Matlin, an FBI undercover agent who is held captive within the ring.

Episodes

Home media

References

External links

Criminal Minds
2010 American television seasons
2011 American television seasons